Sean Campbell may refer to:

Seán Campbell (trade unionist) (1889–1950), Irish trade unionist and politician
Sean Campbell (actor) in Quest for Zhu
Sean Campbell, drummer in The Ocean Fracture
Sean Campbell (field hockey) (born 1973), Canadian field hockey player
Sean Campbell (footballer) (born 1974), English former footballer

See also
Shaun Campbell (disambiguation)
Shawn Campbell (disambiguation)